The Anaikoddai seal is a soapstone seal that was found in Anaikoddai, Sri Lanka during archeological excavations of a megalithic burial site by a team of researchers from the University of Jaffna. The seal was originally part of a signet ring and contains one of the oldest Brahmi inscriptions mixed with megalithic graffiti symbols found on the island. It was dated paleographically to the early third century BC.

Inscription 
Although many pottery fragments have been found in excavations throughout Sri Lanka and South India that had both Brahmi and megalithic graffiti symbols side by side, the Anaikoddai seal is distinguished by having each written in a manner that indicates that the megalithic graffiti symbols may be a translation of the Brahmi. Read from right to left, the legend is read by most scholars in early Tamil as Koveta (Ko-ve-ta ). 'Ko' and 'Veta' both mean 'King' in Tamil and refers to a chieftain here. It is comparable to such names as Ko Ataṉ and Ko Putivira occurring in contemporary Tamil-Brahmi inscriptions. The trident symbol is equated with 'King', and is also found after a Tamil-Brahmi inscription of the Chera dynasty, thus supporting this interpretation.

Investigators disagree on whether megalithic graffiti symbols found in South India and Sri Lanka constitute an ancient writing system that preceded the introduction and widespread acceptance of Brahmi variant scripts or non-lithic symbols. The purpose of usage remains unclear.

See also
 Early Indian epigraphy
 South Indian Inscriptions
 Tamil inscriptions in Sri Lanka

References

Cited literature

 
 
 
 
 
 
 

Ancient Indian culture
Archaeology of India
Indian inscriptions
Inscriptions in undeciphered writing systems
Iron Age Asia
Megalithic symbols
Sri Lankan Tamil history
Sri Lanka inscriptions
Tamil Brahmi script
Tamil inscriptions in Sri Lanka
Tamilakam